The 1983–84 2. Bundesliga season was the tenth season of the 2. Bundesliga, the second tier of the German football league system.

Karlsruher SC and FC Schalke 04 were promoted to the Bundesliga while Rot-Weiss Essen, SC Charlottenburg, VfL Osnabrück and BV 08 Lüttringhausen were relegated to the Oberliga.

League table
For the 1983–84 season Rot-Weiß Oberhausen, SC Charlottenburg, SSV Ulm 1846 and 1. FC Saarbrücken were newly promoted to the 2. Bundesliga from the Oberliga while Hertha BSC, FC Schalke 04 and Karlsruher SC had been relegated to the league from the Bundesliga.

Results

Top scorers 
The league's top scorers:

References

External links
 2. Bundesliga 1983/1984 at Weltfussball.de 
 1983–84 2. Bundesliga at kicker.de 

1983-84
2
Ger